This is a list of rulers of Tuggurt, a medieval Tuareg sultanate centered in Tuggurt (Touggourt), Touggourt District, Algeria.

List of rulers of Tuggurt

See also
Algeria
Presidents of Algeria
Heads of Government of Algeria
Colonial Heads of Algeria
Lists of office-holders

African royalty
Tuareg
Lists of African rulers
Algeria history-related lists
Lists of Berber people